Theodoor van Tulden can refer to:
 Theodoor van Thulden, Dutch artist (1606–1669)
 Diodorus Tuldenus, Dutch legal scholar (died 1645)